Scasiba is a genus of moths in the family Sesiidae.

Species
Scasiba okinawana (Matsumura, 1931)
Scasiba rhynchioides (Butler, 1881)
Scasiba scribai (Bartel, 1912)
Scasiba sheni (Arita & Xu, 1994)
Scasiba difficilis  Kallies & Arita, 2004
Scasiba taikanensis (Matsumura, 1931)
Scasiba tenuimarginata (Hampson, [1893])

References

Sesiidae
Taxa named by Shōnen Matsumura